Berriwillock is a closed railway station on the Kulwin railway line, Victoria, Australia. The platform remains in a reasonable condition, though shelter is very limited.
A telephone is also provided at the station.

Disused railway stations in Victoria (Australia)